The 2009–10 Tampa Bay Lightning season was the 18th season for the National Hockey League (NHL) team. Unlike the previous off-season, the Lightning did not make many roster changes. The Lightning improved on their regular season record but failed to qualify for the Stanley Cup playoffs for the third season in a row. The team was sold during the season to Boston-based investor Jeff Vinik. After the season, Vinik fired the Lightning's management team.

Off-season 
On May 11, the Lightning gave Rick Tocchet a multi-year contract to make him their full-time head coach, removing the interim tag he held after taking over the position from Barry Melrose, who was fired during the previous season after 16 games.

On June 23, NHL Commissioner Gary Bettman met with Lightning co-owners Oren Koules and Len Barrie due to philosophical and financial differences over how to build the team. More details were not available to the public because Bettman imposed a "gag-order" over the meetings. By February, the team was sold and both Koules and Barrie were no longer involved. It was also in this time period that Bettman reportedly vetoed a trade between the Lightning and the Montreal Canadiens that would have sent center Vincent Lecavalier to the Canadiens in exchange for goaltender Carey Price, center Tomas Plekanec and an unnamed prospect.

With the second overall pick in the Entry Draft, the Lightning selected Victor Hedman from Modo Hockey of the Elitserien. Hedman was considered the top European prospect available. Having acquired a second first-round pick from the Detroit Red Wings, the Lightning used the 29th overall selection on Carter Ashton from the Lethbridge Hurricanes of the Western Hockey League (WHL).

Among several of the free agent signings the Lightning made included defenseman Mattias Ohlund, goaltender Antero Niittymaki and left winger Alex Tanguay.

Preseason 

|-  style="text-align:center; background:#b0c4de;"
| 1 || September 16 || Tampa Bay Lightning || 4 – 3 || Dallas Stars || SO || 15,214 || 0–0–1 || 
|-  style="text-align:center; background:#b0c4de;"
| 2 || September 18 || Atlanta Thrashers || 2 – 1 || Tampa Bay Lightning || OT || 16,223 || 0–0–2 || 
|-  style="text-align:center; background:#fbb;"
| 3 || September 21 (in Regina, SK) || Ottawa Senators || 3 – 1 || Tampa Bay Lightning || || || 0–1–2 || 
|-  style="text-align:center; background:#cfc;"
| 4 || September 22 (in Everett, Washington) || Phoenix Coyotes || 2 – 1 || Tampa Bay Lightning || || || 1–1–2 || 
|-  style="text-align:center; background:#b0c4de;"
| 5 || September 23 (in Loveland, Colorado) || Tampa Bay Lightning || 4 – 3 || Phoenix Coyotes || SO || || 1–1–3 || 
|-  style="text-align:center; background:#cfc;"
| 6 || September 24 (in Winnipeg, MB) || Edmonton Oilers || 4 – 3 || Tampa Bay Lightning || OT || || 2–1–3 || 
|-  style="text-align:center; background:#cfc;"
| 7 || September 27 || Tampa Bay Lightning || 5 – 1 || Atlanta Thrashers || || 7,179 || 3–1–3 || 
|-

Regular season 

The Lightning ended the regular season having scored the fewest shorthanded goals in the League, with just 2.

After the regular season finished with Tampa Bay missing the playoffs, the Lightning fired both General Manager Brian Lawton and Head Coach Rick Tocchet on April 12, 2010.

Divisional standings

Conference standings

Game log 

|-  style="text-align:center; background:#fcc;"
| 1 || October 3 || Atlanta Thrashers || 6 – 3 || Philips Arena || 18,545 || 0–1–0  || 0
|-  style="text-align:center; background:#b0c4de;"
| 2 || October 6 || Carolina Hurricanes || 2 – 1 (SO) || RBC Center || 16,186 || 0–1–1 || 1
|-  style="text-align:center; background:#b0c4de;"
| 3 || October 8 || New Jersey Devils || 4 – 3 (SO) || St. Pete Times Forum || 17,454 || 0–1–2 || 2
|-  style="text-align:center; background:#cfc;"
| 4 || October 10 || Carolina Hurricanes || 5 – 2 || St. Pete Times Forum || 14,212 || 1–1–2 || 4
|-  style="text-align:center; background:#cfc;"
| 5 || October 12 || Florida Panthers || 3 – 2 || St. Pete Times Forum || 14,126 || 2–1–2 || 6
|-  style="text-align:center; background:#fcc;"
| 6 || October 15 || Ottawa Senators || 7 – 1 || Scotiabank Place || 17,732 || 2–2–2 || 6
|-  style="text-align:center; background:#fcc;"
| 7 || October 17 || Pittsburgh Penguins || 4 – 1 || Mellon Arena || 17,132 || 2–3–2 || 6
|-  style="text-align:center; background:#cfc;"
| 8 || October 22 || San Jose Sharks || 5 – 2 || St. Pete Times Forum || 13,343 || 3–3–2 || 8
|-  style="text-align:center; background:#b0c4de;"
| 9 || October 24 || Buffalo Sabres || 3 – 2 (SO) || St. Pete Times Forum || 15,804 || 3–3–3 || 9
|-  style="text-align:center; background:#cfc;"
| 10 || October 29 || Ottawa Senators || 5 – 2 || St. Pete Times Forum || 13,213 || 4–3–3 || 11
|-  style="text-align:center; background:#b0c4de;"
| 11 || October 31 || New Jersey Devils || 2 – 1 (SO) || St. Pete Times Forum || 12,154 || 4–3–4 || 12
|-

|-  style="text-align:center; background:#fcc;"
| 12 || November 2 || Philadelphia Flyers || 6 – 2 || Wachovia Center || 18,667 || 4–4–4 || 12
|-  style="text-align:center; background:#cfc;"
| 13 || November 3 || Toronto Maple Leafs || 2 – 1 (OT) || Air Canada Centre || 19,301 || 5–4–4 || 14
|-  style="text-align:center; background:#b0c4de;"
| 14 || November 5 || Ottawa Senators || 3 – 2 (OT) || Scotiabank Place || 17,511 || 5–4–5 || 15
|-  style="text-align:center; background:#cfc;"
| 15 || November 7 || Montreal Canadiens || 3 – 1 || Bell Centre || 21,273 || 6–4–5 || 17
|-  style="text-align:center; background:#cfc;"
| 16 || November 12 || Minnesota Wild || 4 – 3 (SO) || St. Pete Times Forum || 14,530 || 7–4–5 || 19
|-  style="text-align:center; background:#b0c4de;"
| 17 || November 14 || Los Angeles Kings || 2 – 1 (SO) || St. Pete Times Forum || 16,612 || 7–4–6 || 20
|-  style="text-align:center; background:#cfc;"
| 18 || November 16 || Phoenix Coyotes || 4 – 1 || Jobing.com Arena || 9,503 || 8–4–6 || 22
|-  style="text-align:center; background:#b0c4de;"
| 19 || November 19 || Anaheim Ducks || 4 – 3 (OT) || Honda Center || 14,555 || 8–4–7 || 23
|-  style="text-align:center; background:#fcc;"
| 20 || November 21 || Carolina Hurricanes || 3 – 1 || RBC Center || 13,224 || 8–5–7 || 23
|-  style="text-align:center; background:#cfc;"
| 21 || November 22 || Atlanta Thrashers || 4 – 3 (OT) || Philips Arena || 13,342 || 9–5–7 || 25
|-  style="text-align:center; background:#fcc;"
| 22 || November 25 || Toronto Maple Leafs || 4 – 3 || St. Pete Times Forum || 15,333 || 9–6–7 || 25
|-  style="text-align:center; background:#cfc;"
| 23 || November 27 || New York Rangers || 5 – 1 || St. Pete Times Forum || 17,608 || 10–6–7 || 27
|-  style="text-align:center; background:#b0c4de;"
| 24 || November 28 || Dallas Stars || 4 – 3 (OT) || American Airlines Center || 17,334 || 10–6–8 || 28
|-  style="text-align:center; background:#fcc;"
| 25 || November 30 || Colorado Avalanche || 3 – 0 || St. Pete Times Forum || 12,214 || 10–7–8 || 28
|-

|-  style="text-align:center; background:#fcc;"
| 26 || December 2 || Boston Bruins || 4 – 1 || TD Garden || 16,533 || 10–8–8 || 28
|-  style="text-align:center; background:#fcc;"
| 27 || December 4 || New Jersey Devils || 3 – 2 || Prudential Center || 15,336 || 10–9–8 || 28
|-  style="text-align:center; background:#cfc;"
| 28 || December 5 || New York Islanders || 4 – 0 || St. Pete Times Forum || 13,577 || 11–9–8 || 30
|-  style="text-align:center; background:#fcc;"
| 29 || December 7 || Washington Capitals || 3 – 0 || St. Pete Times Forum || 12,400 || 11–10–8 || 30
|-  style="text-align:center; background:#fcc;"
| 30 || December 9 || Edmonton Oilers || 3 – 2 || St. Pete Times Forum || 13,477 || 11–11–8 || 30
|-  style="text-align:center; background:#b0c4de;"
| 31 || December 11 || Colorado Avalanche || 2 – 1 (SO) || Pepsi Center || 12,188 || 11–11–9 || 31
|-  style="text-align:center; background:#fcc;"
| 32 || December 13 || Chicago Blackhawks || 4 – 0 || United Center || 21,081 || 11–12–9 || 31
|-  style="text-align:center; background:#fcc;"
| 33 || December 15 || Nashville Predators || 7 – 4 || Sommet Center || 15,804 || 11–13–9 || 31
|-  style="text-align:center; background:#fcc;"
| 34 || December 17 || Detroit Red Wings || 3 – 0 || Joe Louis Arena || 19,474 || 11–14–9 || 31
|-  style="text-align:center; background:#cfc;"
| 35 || December 18 || St. Louis Blues || 6 – 3 || Scottrade Center || 19,150 || 12–14–9 || 33
|-  style="text-align:center; background:#cfc;"
| 36 || December 21 || New York Islanders || 4 – 2 || Nassau Veterans Memorial Coliseum || 10,864 || 13–14–9 || 35
|-  style="text-align:center; background:#fcc;"
| 37 || December 23 || Philadelphia Flyers || 5 – 2 || St. Pete Times Forum || 16,177 || 13–15–9 || 35
|-  style="text-align:center; background:#cfc;"
| 38 || December 26 || Atlanta Thrashers || 4 – 3 || St. Pete Times Forum || 15,437 || 14–15–9 || 37
|-  style="text-align:center; background:#cfc;"
| 39 || December 28 || Boston Bruins || 2 – 1 || St. Pete Times Forum || 16,926 || 15–15–9 || 39
|-  style="text-align:center; background:#b0c4de;"
| 40 || December 30 || Montreal Canadiens || 2 – 1 (OT) || St. Pete Times Forum || 18,441 || 15–15–10 || 40
|-

|-  style="text-align:center; background:#cfc;"
| 41 || January 2 || Pittsburgh Penguins || 3 – 1 || St. Pete Times Forum || 20,109 || 16–15–10 || 42
|-  style="text-align:center; background:#fcc;"
| 42 || January 6 || Buffalo Sabres || 5 – 3 || HSBC Arena || 18,690 || 16–16–10 || 42
|-  style="text-align:center; background:#cfc;"
| 44 || January 8* || New Jersey Devils || 4 – 2 || Prudential Center || 15,129 || 17–16–10 || 44
|-  style="text-align:center; background:#fcc;"
| 43 || January 9 || Philadelphia Flyers || 4 – 1 || Wachovia Center || 19,678 || 16–17–10 || 44
|-  style="text-align:center; background:#cfc;"
| 45 || January 12 || Washington Capitals || 7 – 4 || St. Pete Times Forum || 13,891 || 18–17–10 || 46
|-  style="text-align:center; background:#fcc;"
| 46 || January 14 || Florida Panthers || 3 – 2 || St. Pete Times Forum || 13,516 || 18–18–10 || 46
|-  style="text-align:center; background:#fcc;"
| 47 || January 16 || Florida Panthers || 5 – 2 || BankAtlantic Center || 15,971 || 18–19–10 || 46
|-  style="text-align:center; background:#cfc;"
| 48 || January 18 || Carolina Hurricanes || 3 – 2 || RBC Center || 16,031 || 19–19–10 || 48
|-  style="text-align:center; background:#fcc;"
| 49 || January 19 || New York Rangers || 8 – 2 || Madison Square Garden || 18,200 || 19–20–10 || 48
|-  style="text-align:center; background:#cfc;"
| 50 || January 21 || Toronto Maple Leafs || 3 – 2 (OT) || St. Pete Times Forum || 13,691 || 20–20–10 || 50
|-  style="text-align:center; background:#cfc;"
| 51 || January 23 || Atlanta Thrashers || 2 – 1 (SO) || St. Pete Times Forum || 16,212 || 21–20–10 || 52
|-  style="text-align:center; background:#cfc;"
| 52 || January 27 || Montreal Canadiens || 3 – 0 || St. Pete Times Forum || 14,404 || 22–20–10 || 54
|-  style="text-align:center; background:#b0c4de;"
| 53 || January 29 || Anaheim Ducks || 2 – 1 (SO) || St. Pete Times Forum || 15,230 || 22–20–11 || 55
|-  style="text-align:center; background:#fcc;"
| 54 || January 31 || Washington Capitals || 3 – 2 || Verizon Center || 18,277 || 22–21–11 || 55
|-
| colspan=8 | *Originally scheduled for January 8, but suspended during the 2nd period due to a lighting failure. Play resumed on January 10 from the moment it was stopped.
|-

|-  style="text-align:center; background:#cfc;"
| 55 || February 2 || Atlanta Thrashers || 2 – 1 || Philips Arena || 11,390 || 23–21–11 || 57
|-  style="text-align:center; background:#cfc;"
| 56 || February 4 || New York Islanders || 5 – 2 || St. Pete Times Forum || 13,891 || 24–21–11 || 59
|-  style="text-align:center; background:#cfc;"
| 57 || February 6 || Calgary Flames || 2 – 1 (OT) || St. Pete Times Forum || 15,859 || 25–21–11 || 61
|-  style="text-align:center; background:#cfc;"
| 58 || February 9 || Vancouver Canucks || 3 – 1 || St. Pete Times Forum || 14,226 || 26–21–11 || 63
|-  style="text-align:center; background:#fcc;"
| 59 || February 11 || Boston Bruins || 5 – 4 || St. Pete Times Forum || 15,826 || 26–22–11 || 63
|-  style="text-align:center; background:#fcc;"
| 60 || February 13 || New York Islanders || 5 – 4 || Nassau Veterans Memorial Coliseum || 12,337 || 26–23–11 || 63
|-  style="text-align:center; background:#fcc;"
| 61 || February 14 || New York Rangers || 5 – 2 || Madison Square Garden || 18,200 || 26–24–11 || 63
|-  style="text-align:center; background:#bbb;"
| colspan=8 |League-wide break for 2010 Winter Olympics (February 15–28)
|-

|-  style="text-align:center; background:#fcc;"
| 62 || March 2 || Philadelphia Flyers || 7 – 2 || St. Pete Times Forum || 17,812 || 26–25–11 || 63
|-  style="text-align:center; background:#fcc;"
| 63 || March 4 || Washington Capitals || 5 – 4 || Verizon Center || 18,277 || 26–26–11 || 63
|-  style="text-align:center; background:#cfc;"
| 64 || March 6 || Atlanta Thrashers || 6 – 2 || St. Pete Times Forum || 19,926 || 27–26–11 || 65
|-  style="text-align:center; background:#fcc;"
| 65 || March 9 || Montreal Canadiens || 5 – 3 || Bell Centre || 21,273 || 27–27–11 || 65
|-  style="text-align:center; background:#b0c4de;"
| 66 || March 11 || Toronto Maple Leafs || 4 – 3 (OT) || Air Canada Centre || 19,110 || 27–27–12 || 66
|-  style="text-align:center; background:#cfc;"
| 67 || March 12 || Washington Capitals || 3 – 2 || Verizon Center || 18,277 || 28–27–12 || 68
|-  style="text-align:center; background:#fcc;"
| 68 || March 14 || Pittsburgh Penguins || 2 – 1 || St. Pete Times Forum || 20,230 || 28–28–12 || 68
|-  style="text-align:center; background:#fcc;"
| 69 || March 16 || Phoenix Coyotes || 2 – 1 || St. Pete Times Forum || 14,517 || 28–29–12 || 68
|-  style="text-align:center; background:#fcc;"
| 70 || March 18 || Buffalo Sabres || 6 – 2 || St. Pete Times Forum || 16,868 || 28–30–12 || 68
|-  style="text-align:center; background:#fcc;"
| 71 || March 20 || Washington Capitals || 3 – 1 || St. Pete Times Forum || 19,844 || 28–31–12 || 68
|-  style="text-align:center; background:#fcc;"
| 72 || March 21 || Florida Panthers || 5 – 2 || BankAtlantic Center || 14,831 || 28–32–12 || 68
|-  style="text-align:center; background:#cfc;"
| 73 || March 23 || Carolina Hurricanes || 3 – 2 (OT) || St. Pete Times Forum || 13,009 || 29–32–12 || 70
|-  style="text-align:center; background:#cfc;"
| 74 || March 25 || Boston Bruins || 5 – 3 || TD Garden || 17,565 || 30–32–12 || 72
|-  style="text-align:center; background:#fcc;"
| 75 || March 27 || Buffalo Sabres || 7 – 1 || HSBC Arena || 18,690 || 30–33–12 || 72
|-  style="text-align:center; background:#fcc;"
| 76 || March 30 || Columbus Blue Jackets || 3 – 2 || Nationwide Arena || 15,760 || 30–34–12 || 72
|-  style="text-align:center; background:#cfc;"
| 77 || March 31 || Pittsburgh Penguins || 2 – 0 || Mellon Arena || 17,132 || 31–34–12 || 74
|-

|-  style="text-align:center; background:#fcc;"
| 78 || April 2 || New York Rangers || 5 – 0 || St. Pete Times Forum || 17,909 || 31–35–12 || 74
|-  style="text-align:center; background:#fcc;"
| 79 || April 6 || Carolina Hurricanes || 8 – 5 || St. Pete Times Forum || 12,454 || 31–36–12 || 74
|-  style="text-align:center; background:#cfc;"
| 80 || April 8 || Ottawa Senators || 4 – 3 (SO) || St. Pete Times Forum || 15,876 || 32–36–12 || 76
|-  style="text-align:center; background:#cfc;"
| 81 || April 10 || Florida Panthers || 4 – 3 (SO) || St. Pete Times Forum || 17,050 || 33–36–12 || 78
|-  style="text-align:center; background:#cfc;"
| 82 || April 11 || Florida Panthers || 3 – 1 || BankAtlantic Center || 15,884 || 34–36–12 || 80
|-

|-
| Schedule

Playoffs
For the third consecutive year, the Lightning failed to qualify for the playoffs.

Player stats

Skaters
Note: GP = Games played; G = Goals; A = Assists; Pts = Points; +/− = Plus/minus; PIM = Penalty minutes

Goaltenders
Note: GP = Games played; TOI = Time on ice (minutes); W = Wins; L = Losses; OT = Overtime losses; GA = Goals against; GAA= Goals against average; SA= Shots against; SV= Saves; Sv% = Save percentage; SO= Shutouts

†Denotes player spent time with another team before joining Lightning. Stats reflect time with Lightning only.
‡Traded mid-season
Bold/italics denotes franchise record

Awards and records

Awards

Records

Milestones

Transactions 

The Lightning have been involved in the following transactions during the 2009–10 season.

Trades

Free agents acquired

Free agents lost

Claimed via waivers

Lost via waivers

Player signings

Draft picks 

Tampa Bay's picks at the 2009 NHL Entry Draft in Montreal.

See also 
 2009–10 NHL season

References 

Tampa Bay Lightning seasons
T
T
Tamp
Tamp